Beauty and the Boss (lit. Amelia's Rhapsody) is a Hong Kong television series created and produced by television network TVB. Executive produced by Marco Law, it exclusively premiered on myTV Super OTT streaming service in December 2020 as the platform's original series before being broadcast on TVB Jade from 22 March 2021 to 30 April 2021 for 30 episodes. With romantic comedy as the central theme and a cast starring Ali Lee, Moses Chan, Edwin Siu, Raymond Cho, Jeannie Chan, Harriet Yeung, and Zoie Tam, it chronicles the lives of a group of colleagues and friends working at the fictional public relations company, Skywise Strategy Group.

Cast

 Ali Lee as Amelia Wong Lai-mei: a married woman for ten years who later divorces her husband after finding out he has an extramarital affair.
 Moses Chan as Matt Mak Tsz-fung: local branch CEO of Skywise Strategy Group
 Edwin Siu as Tong Yan: a partner at Skywise. He has a sissy personality with an ambiguous sexual orientation.
 Raymond Cho as So Chak-kei: an account executive at Skywise. Grieving over his wife's death many years ago, he started having an uncommitted sex life.
 Jeannie Chan as Lee Siu-yung: she works at Skywise and has a boyish personality.
 Harriet Yeung as Kiki Choi See-ki: Vice Director at Skywise who suffers from hypersexuality.
 Zoie Tam as Ho Yu-yan: she initially works at the rival public relations company, Blue Rain who later joins Skywise after meeting and befriending Siu-yung.
 Matthew Ho as Rex Cheng Yu: CEO of a mobile game development company who has a crush on Amelia
 Ashley Chu as Mandy Man Ching: CEO of Skywise's Greater Bay Area
 Claire Yiu as Shum Wai: Matt's ex-wife
 Telford Wong as Chau Cheuk-hin: Amelia's stepson
 William Hu as Chau Ka-ming: Amelia's husband who later is divorced
 Iris Lam as Lam Nam: works at Skywise
 Anthony Ho as Pang Yu-ngan: works at Skywise
 Fei Wu as Tsui Fei: works at Skywise
 Stitch Yu as Lam Nga-ting: works at Skywise
 Virginia Lau as Cheung Yuet: a model and Matt's girlfriend
 Hugo Wong as Hon Lui: a financial higher-up. He is married and later develops an extramarital relationship with Yu-yan
 Jackson Lai as Wong Lam: Siu-yung's senior during their school years whom she has a crush on

Synopsis

Amelia Wong has been married for ten years, becoming a housewife. One day, she finds out her husband has an extramarital affair and decides to get a divorce, realizing that she has misspent her youth with a failed marriage. Through her good friend, Kiki Choi, an executive at the public relations company Skywise Strategy Group, Wong is employed there as a secretary. Here she befriends a group of good colleagues. During the process, Amelia falls in love with her boss Matt Mak, while taking the initiative to search for a journey of love, finding oneself, and finding one’s dreams.

Production and background

Principal photography took place approximately from June to October 2019. Utilizing romantic comedy as the backdrop, Beauty and the Boss focused on a female-based theme, highlighting the modern women in the working world and their pursuit of love and happiness. Executive producer Marco Law expressed:

Music 

The tracks were produced by Joseph Wei, Alex Lau, and Herman To and released under The Voice Entertainment Group.

Reception and ratings

Sam Ngou-ming from Ming Pao Weekly described Beauty and the Boss as a "healing drama about life". Law Ji-wang from UlifeStyle noted "its plot to be realistic and down-to-earth accompanied with warm, unconventional dialogues". Law and an editor at Hong Kong Economic Times also emphasised on the inspirational life quotes at the end of each episode which "resonated with the audience". Meanwhile, Tung Yan-hei from HK01 praised each character to have their own "full and distinctive" color.

Awards and nominations

Notes

References

External links
 

2020 Hong Kong television series debuts
2021 Hong Kong television series debuts
Hong Kong drama television series
Hong Kong romance television series
TVB dramas
TVB original programming